Jasmin Džeko (born 15 November 1958) is a retired Bosnian-Herzegovinian footballer who played as a defender for SFR Yugoslavia.

Playing career

International
He made his debut for Yugoslavia in a March 1983 friendly match away against Romania and has earned a total of 2 caps, scoring 1 goal. His second and final international was an April 1983 friendly against France.

Managerial career
Džeko has been managing clubs in the Austrian lower leagues.

References

External links

Profile at Serbian federation site

1958 births
Living people
People from Doboj
Association football defenders
Yugoslav footballers
Yugoslavia international footballers
Bosnia and Herzegovina footballers
NK Osijek players
GNK Dinamo Zagreb players
SV Spittal players
FK Sloga Doboj players
Yugoslav Second League players
Yugoslav First League players
2. Liga (Austria) players
Yugoslav expatriate footballers
Bosnia and Herzegovina expatriate footballers
Expatriate footballers in Austria
Yugoslav expatriate sportspeople in Austria
Bosnia and Herzegovina expatriate sportspeople in Austria
Bosnia and Herzegovina football managers
FC Kärnten managers
Bosnia and Herzegovina expatriate football managers
Expatriate football managers in Austria